FSC may refer to:

Education
 Farmingdale State College, a college in New York, United States
 Fitchburg State College, now Fitchburg State University, in Massachusetts, United States
 Film Study Center at Harvard University
 Florida Southern College, in Lakeland, Florida, United States
 Florida State College at Jacksonville, a college in Florida, United States
 Florida Sun Conference, an American college athletic conference
 Forest School Camps, a British camping organisation
 Framingham State College, a college in Massachusetts, United States
 Institute of the Brothers of the Christian Schools, a Roman Catholic religious teaching order

Finance 
 Financial Services Commission (disambiguation)
 Financial Supervision Commission, Isle of Man
 Financial Supervisory Commission (Taiwan)
 Foreign Sales Corporation, a repealed tax device of the United States Internal Revenue Code

Governmental and politics 
 Catalan Federation of the PSOE, a defunct political party in Catalonia, Spain
 Federal Salary Council, an advisory body of the United States federal government
 Federal Shariat Court of Pakistan
 Fire Safety Commission
 Texas Forensic Science Commission, a state agency of Texas, United States

Industry 
Fabryka Samochodów Ciężarowych, a Polish automotive company
 Fiji Sugar Corporation, a Fiji government-owned sugar milling company
Fujitsu Siemens Computers, a Japanese and German IT supply chain
Future Supply Chains, an Indian logistics and supply chain company

Other organisations
 Les Scouts - Fédération des Scouts Baden-Powell de Belgique (FSC, Catholic Baden-Powell-Scout Federation of Belgium)
 Field Studies Council, a British environmental education charity
 Filipino Society of Cinematographers
 First Satanic Church, an organization dedicated to Satanism and the occult
 Forest Stewardship Council, an international environmental organization
 Free Speech Coalition, a trade association for the adult film and pornography industry
 Fountain Street Church, in Grand Rapids, Michigan, United States

Other uses
 Figari Sud-Corse Airport, in Corsica, France
 Fine-structure constant
 Fire safe cigarette
 Firearm Safety Certificate
 Foo Swee Chin (born 1977), Singaporean comic book artist
 Food supply chain
 Football South Coast, in New South Wales, Australia
 Fourier shell correlation
 Funvic Soul Cycles–Carrefour, a Brazilian cycling team
 Future Surface Combatant of the Royal Navy